Eupithecia mirei is a moth in the  family Geometridae. It is found in the Tibesti Region in Chad.

References

Moths described in 1965
mirei
Moths of Africa